Albert Kuntz (December 4, 1896 – January 22, 1945) was a German goldsmith, soldier,  communist and concentration camp victim. A soldier in the First World War, Kuntz rose to become an elected representative of the German Communist Party in Berlin's Prussian Landtag. In 1933 he was arrested by the Gestapo, and sent to a succession of prisons and concentration camps. He died in January 1945 at the Mittelbau-Dora concentration camp, where he had been organizing the sabotage of the V-2 rocket production line. Following his death, he was revered as an anti-fascist hero in East Germany.

Early life
Born in Bennewitz in 1896, Kuntz' first profession was as a goldsmith. In 1916 he enlisted in the German army, fighting at the front, where he was wounded. Following this he joined the German Socialist Party, and then the Communist Party of Germany (KPD) in 1919.

Communist Party
In 1919 he co-founded a local group of the KPD in Wurzen, and became a city councillor there in 1921.
In 1923 he became a full-time KPD functionary in Leipzig, as the organizational manager for west Saxony. In 1924 he was sentenced to eight months' imprisonment for violating the peace, which was later suspended. After working in Chemnitz in 1925–26, he went in 1926 as a functionary to the KPD district leadership in Hesse-Frankfurt. In October 1928 he took over the leadership of the Hessen-Frankfurt district as political director. In 1929 he moved to Berlin and became a candidate for the Central Committee of the KPD, which sent him to the International Lenin School in Moscow. After a nine-month stay there, in 1930 he became organizational secretary of the Berlin-Brandenburg district leadership of the KPD. In April 1932 he was elected to the Prussian state parliament. By 1933, Kuntz had risen to the position of Communist deputy in the Prussian Landtag, the representative assembly of the Kingdom of Prussia in Berlin. From June 1932 until his arrest in 1933, he worked as the political secretary of the Hesse-Frankfurt party district.

Imprisonment and death

Kuntz was arrested on March 12, 1933, by the Gestapo, who attempted to prosecute him for the deaths of German officers. At the time of his arrest, Kuntz was living at Afrikanische Straße 140 in Berlin-Wedding, according to a stolperstein installed there. He was sentenced to three years in prison. From 1933 to 1935 he was held in the Kassel prison. 

From 1935 to 1937, he was held in the Lichtenburg concentration camp. At each of the concentration camps where he was held, he was used by the camp administration to organize construction activities. At Lichtenberg, he worked on the construction of heating and bathing systems. From 1937 to 1943, he was a prisoner of the Buchenwald concentration camp. There, he became the responsible person for irrigation and drainage. At both camps, he organized secret meetings of the Communist party, together with Theodor Neubauer and Walter Stoecker.

In 1943 he was moved from Buchenwald to the nearby Mittelbau-Dora concentration camp, where he would stay until his death in 1945. As a prisoner he was a bauleiter, or construction supervisor, under the direction of the camp Nazi commandant SS-Sturmbannführer Otto Förschner. A political prisoner, he wore the red triangle badge to signify this status. While at Dora-Mittelbau, he organized a group to sabotage the V-2 rockets that were being produced in underground galleries at the camp.
In December 1944 the Mittelbau-Dora guards began a round up of suspected saboteurs. Kuntz was interrogated and tortured; he died the night of January 22–23, 1945, in his cell there; the cause of death was not announced.

Legacy
As a communist leader presumed to have been murdered by the Nazis, Kuntz was highly regarded in communist East Germany, where children were taught to revere Kuntz as an anti-fascist resistance fighter and hero. A memorial to his death was erected at Station Square, Nordhausen at the end of 1946. His name was frequently applied to buildings, streets and schools:
A school in Nordhausen, the  Grundschule Albert Kuntz, bears his name. 
A helicopter squadron, Hubschrauberstaffel 16 Albert Kuntz, was named after him. 
In Berlin, the street Albert-Kuntz-Strasse was named after him.
The Albert Kuntz Sports Park in Nordhausen is named after him. 
In Havana, Cuba, the cookie factory Fábrica de Galletas Albert Kuntz bearing his name was inaugurated by Che Guevera in 1962.

In 1958, the DDR issued a stamp in his honour.

Personal life
Kuntz was married at the time of his arrest. His wife Ellen, (née Geissler, born February 2, 1898) remained in Berlin during his incarceration. She died May 21 1986.

Bibliography
 Wolfgang Kiessling: Stark und voller Hoffnung, Leben und Kampf von Albert Kuntz. Berlin 1964.
 Wolfgang Kießling: Albert Kuntz. In: Wurzen 961–1961. Festschrift zur Tausendjahrfeier, Wurzen 1961, S. 120–144.
 Leo Kuntz, Leopoldine Kuntz, Hannelore und Götz Dieckmann (Hrsg.): Albert Kuntz „Liebste Ellen …“ Briefe aus der Nazihaft 1933–1944. Berlin 2005.
 Olaf Mussmann: Albert Kuntz (1896–1945) – heldenhafter Widerstandskämpfer gegen den Nationalsozialismus oder opportunistischer Überlebensstratege.
 Lutz Niethammer (Hrsg.): Der „gesäuberte“ Antifaschismus. Die SED und die roten Kapos von Buchenwald. Berlin 1994, wiederholte Aufl., u. a. Akademie, Berlin 2005.
 Kuntz, Albert. Biographical database (in German)

References 

German communists
People who died in Mittelbau-Dora concentration camp
People from Leipzig (district)
German goldsmiths
German Army personnel of World War I
1896 births
1945 deaths
German people who died in Nazi concentration camps